"Go Out" is a song by English rock band Blur. It is the lead single from their eighth studio album The Magic Whip. A music video for the song was released on YouTube on 19 February 2015.

Personnel
Damon Albarn – vocals
Graham Coxon – guitar
Alex James – bass guitar
Dave Rowntree – drums

Charts

References

2015 singles
2015 songs
Blur (band) songs
Song recordings produced by Stephen Street
Songs written by Alex James (musician)
Songs written by Damon Albarn
Songs written by Dave Rowntree
Songs written by Graham Coxon